Georgia State Route 80 Alternate may refer to:

 Georgia State Route 80 Alternate (Burke County): a former alternate route of State Route 80 that existed in northern Burke County
 Georgia State Route 80 Alternate (Warrenton): an alternate route of State Route 80 that exists in Warren County, with the southern part in Warrenton

080 Alternate